Hébertville is a municipality in Quebec, Canada.

History 

Hébertville was founded in 1849. It was the first establishment to be colonised in the Lac Saint-Jean area. This municipality offered a future development near the Aulnaies Falls, situated at the heart of the village.

At this location, saw and flour mills were constructed to provide work and food for the first inhabitants.

See also
 List of municipalities in Quebec

References

External links

Municipalities in Quebec
Incorporated places in Saguenay–Lac-Saint-Jean